The Terror of the Tongs is a 1961 British adventure film directed by Anthony Bushell and starring Geoffrey Toone, Christopher Lee and Yvonne Monlaur.

Plot
In the year of 1910, Hong Kong members of the secret Red Dragon Tong crime family protect their identities by murdering Helena Sale, the daughter of Captain Jackson Sale, a British sea officer who vows revenge and defies the spread of fear created by the tongs. Helped by a mysterious beggar and a young serving girl named Lee, Sale discovers there is an inside traitor who has been giving vital information to the tongs, thus making them one step ahead of Sale's findings...

Cast
 Christopher Lee as Chung King, Leader of the Red Dragon Tong's Hong Kong division and the primary antagonist.
 Geoffrey Toone as Captain Jackson Sale, a leading figure in the colony and primary protagonist whose daughter is murdered by the tongs.
 Yvonne Monlaur as Lee, a mixed-race serving girl and Sale's love interest.
 Marne Maitland as the Beggar, an agent of an underground movement against the tongs.
 Brian Worth as District Commissioner Harcourt. 
 Ewen Solon as Tang How, Tong Leader's Aide and Chung King's right-hand man.
 Roger Delgado as Tang Hao, tong enforcer. 
 Richard Leech as Inspector Bob Dean.
 Charles Lloyd-Pack as Dr. Fu Chao, tong member who murders people mainly by giving then lethal injections.
 Marie Burke as Maya, a friend of Captain Sale.
 Barbara Brown as Helena Sale. Captain Sale's daughter who is murdered by the tongs.
 Burt Kwouk as Mr. Ming, a diplomat carrying important documents concerning the tongs.

Production
The Terror of the Tongs was quickly shot within the months of April and May 1960.

The film is a quasi-remake of Hammer's 1959 film The Stranglers of Bombay. The setting is changed to Hong Kong in 1910 from India in the 19th century but the basic plot of a middle-aged, yet youthful hero attempting to uncover the crimes of a secret sect in a British colony, being captured by the sect, and later released, having a personal stake in the outcome, finding that there is an inside villain, and losing friends or family are all there.

The film is notable in that is the first Hammer horror film to afford Christopher Lee top billing. Lee also reported to work on the film after a vacation in Northern Italy with a deep tan, which was problematic for the make-up department since his character was supposed to have very pale skin. Lee later said in interviews that the make-up to make him appear Chinese in this movie was the most uncomfortable make-up he had had to endure up to that time.

Critical reception 

The Hammer Story: The Authorised History of Hammer Films wrote of the film: "The Terror of the Tongs, perhaps thankfully a rarely-seen film, remains resolutely undistinguished in almost every department."

A tie-in to the film written by Jimmy Sangster and based upon his screenplay was published by Digit Books in 1961.

Cultural references 
On the film's opening matinee showing at a Picture House in Sauchiehall Street Glasgow, a crowd of rowdy teenagers and young adults both male and female ran down the street shouting "tongs" causing a melee in which the police had to be called. To this day in Glasgow gang culture the cry of "tongs ya bass" can often be heard wherever youths come together to fight in a show of territorial loyalty.

References

Sources

External links
 

1961 films
1960s historical adventure films
1960s crime thriller films
British historical adventure films
British crime thriller films
Films directed by Anthony Bushell
Films scored by James Bernard
Films set in 1910
Films set in Hong Kong
Hammer Film Productions films
Films with screenplays by Jimmy Sangster
1960s English-language films
1960s British films